The Centro de Tecnologia da Informação Renato Archer (CTI) is a research and development center of the Brazilian Ministry of Science and Technology (MCT), previously named Fundação Centro Tecnológico para Informática (CTI), which was founded 1982. It is located in the city of Campinas, state of São Paulo, at the Rodovia Dom Pedro I. The center was thus named in honor of former Brazilian politician, naval officer and minister of science and technology Renato Archer.

CTI Renato Archer has the aim of developing and implementing scientific and technological research in the areas of information technology, microelectronics and automation. One of its missions is to establish collaborative ties with the corresponding industrial sectors in Brazil, in order to carry out technology transfer.

Presently the center has 160 public servants and 500 contractors in 12 laboratories.

CTI Renato Archer was responsible for the first official demonstration of an electronic voting system. This demonstration occurred in 1990, and was performed jointly with Associação Brasileira de Informática (ABINFO). This demonstration has been witnessed by major press representatives.

CTI Renato Archer was also responsible for the first Liquid Crystal Display pilot line in South Hemisphere.

CTI Renato Archer pioneered also in Robotics by demonstrating the first unmanned zeppelin in the south hemisphere.

CTI Renato Archer pioneered also in semiconductor research by establishing the first lithography mask fab in south hemisphere.

Research institutes in Brazil
Organisations based in Campinas